Juliao Menezes (7 August 1909 – 2 July 1980), popularly known as Dr. Juliao Menezes was an Indian freedom fighter, medical practitioner, author and nationalist leader from Goa. He was one of the salient individuals in liberating Goa from the Portuguese rule and was active in the Goa liberation movement.

Menezes established the "Gomantak Praja Mandal" for widespread of national passion for Goans. He was also a member of the provisional committee of the National Congress in Goa and was present at its session in 1948. He played an active part, during its formation. Menezes along with socialist leader, Ram Manohar Lohia planned the civil disobedience movement against Salazar's regime in Goa.

Early life and education 

Juliao Menezes was born to Zeferinho Piedade Menezes, a seafarer by profession and Maria Salvacao. He was the second child and had five siblings, Argentina, Rupertina, Roque, Menelau and Alzira.

Menezes's father died when he was young which brought about financial restraints to the family. Despite this, his mother encouraged him to study at Berlin University in Germany, wherein he graduated with a medical degree.

Role in Goa's freedom struggle (1930–1948)
During his school days, Menezes looked upon Luis de Menezes Braganza and other prominent writers as his role model. He met Lohia at Berlin University, wherein the two studied medicine and economics and eventually became friends, they were part of the Indian Students Union in Berlin. Menezes also offered safety to Lohia when he went into hiding during the Quit India Movement.

The first event, the duo created history was in 1930 during the session of the League of Nations, wherein the two were responsible for throwing bundles of leaflets from the visitors gallery by denouncing the Maharaja of Bikaner, an Indian representative who was sent by the British.

In 1938, Menezes started spreading nationalistic ardour with the support of Juvenile Club de Assolna. It was during this time, a library was set-up for the freedom fighters of the Assolna, Velim and Cuncolim (AVC) villages. However, the Portuguese raided the club and library premises, but were unable to arrest Menezes. They later auctioned the library and club assets through the revenue department. Taking the event in consideration, the Portuguese government forced upon a ban on gatherings of more than five people in the Assolna market for three months.

It was during the 1940s, Goa's Independence had procured momentum which was inspired by India's independence movement against the British India government. On 18 June 1946 Menezes, along with Lohia, hosted a pro-independence convention at Panjim. Following this meeting, the duo were arrested by the Portuguese government.

Publications
In 1939, Menezes founded "Gomantak Praja Mandal" in Bombay with an aim to spread national passion amongst the Goans. Three years later in 1942, Menezes launched the bilingual, English-Konkani weekly "Gomantak". Some of Menezes's notable publications include, "Beitrag zur chirurgischen Behandlung des Nierensteinleidens" (1938),"Goa's Freedom Struggle" (1947), "Goa: What of the Future" and "Contra Roma E Além de Benares" (1948).

Death 
Menezes died as a bachelor at his residence in Mumbai on 2 July 1980, aged 70.

Legacy 

A memorial was constructed within the Assolna market, named after Menezes and his companion, Ram Manohar Lohia, called the Lohia Chowk.

References 

1909 births
1980 deaths
Goan people
People of Portuguese India
Humboldt University of Berlin alumni
People from South Goa district
Medical doctors from Goa
People from Mumbai
20th-century Indian medical doctors
20th-century Indian politicians